Datana major, the major datana or azalea caterpillar, is a moth of the  family Notodontidae. It is found from Maryland to Florida, west to Kansas and Arkansas.

The wingspan is 40–50 mm. Adults are on wing from June to August. Normally, there is one generation per year, although there may be a partial second generation in the southern part of the range.

The larvae mainly feed on Rhododendron and Andromeda polifolia, but have also been recorded on apple, blueberry and red oak. First instar larvae feed in a cluster side by side. Young larvae skeletonize the leaves and the larger ones eat the entire leaf.

External links
Bug Guide
Butterflies and Moths of North America
Azalea Caterpillar, Datana major Grote & Robinson (Insecta: Lepidoptera: Notodontidae)

Notodontidae
Moths described in 1866